is the third theatrical film based on the anime series Kinnikuman. It was released in Japan on March 16, 1985, alongside Gu-Gu Ganmo, Dengeki Sentai Changeman, and Tongari Boushi no Memoru. It is set after the Golden Mask Arc.

This film is the first to feature anime original character Kinkotsu-Obaba. Although this film is set after the Golden Mask Arc, the character Geronimo does not appear as an active fighter until the next film. He does, however, appear in flashbacks to the Golden Mask conclusion. This is also the second time voice actor Ichirō Nagai appears in a Kinnikuman work playing the main villain. He had previously appeared in the TV Special. It also features the return of voice actors Kōzō Shioya and Yasuo Tanaka, who had previously appeared in the first film Stolen Championship Belt.

New characters

Synopsis
While Kinnikuman is on vacation with Mari-san's kindergarten class at Easter Island, the young Kouichi-kun, who uses a wheelchair, laments being with Kinnikuman, preferring to instead be with his favorite Seigi Choujin Buffaloman. Meanwhile, the other Seigi Choujins are also vacationing at ancient landmarks

Songs
Opening Theme
"" by Akira Kushida

Closing Theme
"" by Akira Kamiya (Kinnikuman)

Cast

In the previous film, Daisuke Gōri played the opponent of Masashi Hirose's character. This time Hirose is playing the opponent of Gōri's character.
This is the second Kinnikuman film where Issei Futamata plays Ramenman's opponent. He had previously done this in Great Riot! Seigi Choujin. He also played Ramenman's opponent in the 1984 TV Special.

External links
 
 

1985 films
1985 anime films
Kinnikuman films